Kavaja may refer to the Municipality of Kavajë.

Kavaja may also refer to:

 Kavajë District
 Besa Kavajë
 Kavaja Street
 Bahri Kavaja (1924–1987)
 Nikola Kavaja (1932–2008)
 Omer Pashë Kavaja
 Kavaja United

bg:Кавая
cs:Kavaja
de:Kavaja
ko:카바여
hu:Kavaja
mk:Каваја
pnb:کاوایہ
pl:Kawaja
ro:Kavaja
ru:Кавая
sq:Kavaja
sr:Каваја
sv:Kavaja
ur:کاوایہ
vo:Kavaja
zh:卡瓦亚